Gusheh-ye Sad-e Vaqas (also Romanized as Gūsheh-ye Sa‘d-e Vaqāş and Gūsheh Sa‘d-e Vaqqāş; also known as Gūsheh) is a village in Tariq ol Eslam Rural District, in the Central District of Nahavand County, Hamadan Province, Iran. At the 2006 census, its population was 653, in 171 families.

References 

Populated places in Nahavand County